Adult Contemporary is a chart published by Billboard ranking the top-performing songs in the United States in the adult contemporary music (AC) market.  In 2012, nine different songs topped the chart in 52 issues of the magazine, based on weekly airplay data from radio stations compiled by Nielsen Broadcast Data Systems.

On the first chart of the year, the number one position was held by Michael Bublé with "All I Want for Christmas Is You", the song's fifth consecutive week at number one.  The following week it was replaced in the top spot by British singer Adele's song "Someone like You", which had first reached number one the previous December and now returned to number one for a further four weeks.  Adele would return to the top spot in March with "Set Fire to the Rain", and was the only act to achieve more than one AC number one in 2012.  After four weeks, "Set Fire to the Rain" was displaced by "Just a Kiss" by the country music trio Lady Antebellum.  The song had reached number one on Billboards Hot Country Songs chart the previous summer, but was not serviced to adult contemporary radio until August 2011, and subsequently took 24 weeks to reach the top spot on the AC listing.

The longest unbroken run at number one on the Adult Contemporary listing during 2012 was 16 weeks, achieved by "Somebody That I Used to Know" by Belgian-Australian singer-songwriter Gotye and New Zealand singer Kimbra, which reached the top of the chart in August.  Although both acts had experienced success in their native countries, the song was the international breakthrough for both.  In the United States it was successful across multiple genres, topping a number of Billboard charts, including Alternative Songs and Dance/Mix Show Airplay, as well as reaching number one on the magazine's all-genre chart, the Hot 100.  It was replaced at number one on the AC chart in the issue of the magazine dated December 8 by veteran British singer Rod Stewart's recording of the 1945 song "Let It Snow! Let It Snow! Let It Snow!", which went on to be the year's final chart-topper, holding the top spot for the final four weeks of 2012.  Stewart's song continued a trend of Christmas-themed songs topping the AC chart at the end of the year, reflecting the fact that adult contemporary radio stations usually switch to playing exclusively festive songs in December.

Chart history

See also
2012 in music
List of artists who reached number one on the U.S. Adult Contemporary chart

References

2012
Number-one adult contemporary singles
United States Adult Contemporary